Minuscule 31 (in the Gregory-Aland numbering), ε 375 (Von Soden), formerly it was known as Colbertinus 6063. It is a Greek minuscule manuscript of the New Testament, written on vellum and paper. Palaeographically it has been assigned to the 13th century. It has marginalia.

Description 

The codex contains a complete text of the four Gospels on 188 paper leaves. The texts of Luke 3:38-4:19; 5:39-6:33 were supplied by a later hand. The manuscript is ornamented.

The text is written in one column per page, 25 lines per page, with wide margins (size of column 13.2 by 9.2 cm). The titles are in colour.

The text of the codex was many times corrected.

Text 

The Greek text of the codex Kurt Aland did not place in any Category. According to the Claremont Profile Method it represents textual family Kx in Luke 1 and Luke 20. In Luke 10 no profile was made.

It has many erasures and corrections.

History 
It is dated by the INTF to the 13th century.

The manuscript was used by John Mill (as Colbertinus 4 after Matthew). It was added to the list of the New Testament manuscripts by J. J. Wettstein, who gave it the number 31. It was examined and described by Scholz and it was examined by Paulin Martin. C. R. Gregory saw the manuscript in 1885.

It is currently housed at the Bibliothèque nationale de France (Gr. 94) at Paris.

See also 

 List of New Testament minuscules
 Biblical manuscripts
 Textual criticism

References

Further reading 

 

Greek New Testament minuscules
13th-century biblical manuscripts
Bibliothèque nationale de France collections